
This is a list of unmade and unreleased animated projects by Sony Pictures Animation. Some of these films were or still are, in development limbo. These also include the co-productions the studio collaborated with in the past (i.e The Kerner Entertainment Company, Aardman Animations, The Jim Henson Company, Lord Miller Productions, Rovio Animation, Base FX, and Laurence Mark Productions), as well as sequels to their franchises.

2000s

2002

2003

2004

2005

2008

2009

2010s

2010

2011

2012

2014

2019

See also
 List of unproduced 20th Century Fox animated projects
 List of unproduced Disney animated projects
 List of unproduced DreamWorks Animation projects 
 List of unproduced Universal Pictures animated projects 
 List of unproduced Warner Bros. Animation projects

References

Sony Pictures Animation
Sony Pictures Entertainment
Sony Pictures Animation
Unreleased Sony Pictures Animation